Angry White Men: American Masculinity at the End of an Era is a sociological critique of the angry white male phenomenon in America by Michael Kimmel, first published in 2013. The book was re-published in April 2017 with a new preface by Kimmel discussing U.S. President Donald Trump.

Overview
Kimmel examines what he describes as the "aggrieved entitlement" of white men in early 21st-century American society. According to Kimmel, many white men, as members of a historically dominant group in America, have reacted to increases in social equality and the loss of economic advantage with overt anger and rage. Written from a scholarly perspective, the book describes various manifestations of this anger, including domestic violence, shootings, involvement in white supremacist groups, and the men's rights and fathers' rights movements. Each chapter of the book discusses a different topic and population of men, including young men and violence, men's rights groups, men's violence toward women, the white working class, and white supremacist groups such as Neo-Nazis.

Reception

Describing the book as a "missed opportunity", the Financial Times's Gary Silverman writes: 

Sarah Sobieraj from Tufts University writes that the book will "inspire robust debate in many undergraduate classrooms" but that it "will not, however, be popular with angry white men," noting that it is a "shame" that the men who are represented within the book are likely the men that will not want to read it. Zak Foste from Ohio State University "honors" Kimmel for his work interviewing so many men with whom he disagreed on a fundamental level in order to write this book.

See also
 Male privilege
 Masculinity
 Misogyny

References

2013 non-fiction books
Books about men
Books about race and ethnicity
English-language books
Masculinity
American political books
Works about White Americans